Philip John Edward Spencer (born 11 December 1969) is an English media personality, television presenter and journalist, best known as the co-presenter of Channel 4 property show Location, Location, Location along with its spin-off Relocation, Relocation between 2004 and 2011 alongside Kirstie Allsopp.

Education 

Spencer was educated at Uppingham School, a co-educational independent school in the small market town of Uppingham, Rutland, in the Midlands, where he was Head Boy.

Business career 

Having studied as a surveyor in the early 1990s, Spencer decided that there was a lack of professional support available for buyers, and set himself up as a home finder. He founded property search company Garrington Home Finders Ltd in 1996. He describes himself as not the first to see this opportunity "but I was probably second or third, and Kirstie [Allsopp] was the fourth." The company entered into administration in early 2009.

Spencer remains an active property investor and landlord.

He launched the website Move iQ in 2018 to support buyers and renters in the UK property market, and tenants in the UK.

Media career 

In early 2010, Spencer partnered with co-host Kirstie Allsopp and launched a new independent production company called Raise the Roof with colleagues from IWC Media.  Spencer is a director and shareholder.

Spencer has written three books. In April 2010 his book Adding Value to Your Home was published.

Spencer hosted the daytime game show The Common Denominator, on Channel 4.

Personal life 

Spencer grew up in Littlebourne, Kent and lives in Hampshire, with his Australian wife Fiona, and their two sons. He is an Ambassador for SOS Children's Villages. He is a patron of St Mungos, a London homelessness charity. He is also a supporter of the Countryside Alliance.

In August 2014, Spencer was one of 200 public figures who were signatories to a letter to The Guardian opposing Scottish independence in the run-up to the 2014 referendum on that issue.

Bibliography

References

External links 

 
 
 Listen: The Move iQ Podcast
 Learn: Phil Spencer's Property Report | Move iQ
 Read: Why Should You Get a Property Survey?

1969 births
Alumni of London South Bank University
Channel 4 people
English television presenters
British estate agents (people)
Living people
People educated at Uppingham School
People from Littlebourne
British landlords